, who is also known by the pen name , is a Japanese writer and manga author from Fukuoka. She had a successful career as professional shogi player but quit during a sex scandal with another professional player, Makoto Nakahara, in 1995. Since then, she has focused on writing and TV work. She has written two novel series, Tondemo Police and Kiss Dakeja Iya, and the manga Shion no Ō. In 2010, after a 15-year absence, she returned to shogi.

Shogi professional

Hayashiba defeated professional shogi player  in a 1991  game using the rare Sleeve Rook opening as Black, which made her the first female professional to defeat a male in a tournament game. Hayashiba's victory, however, is considered to be an "unofficial" because the Ginga Tournament did not become an official tournament until 2000.

She had the record for the highest yearly winning rate of 0.852 (23 wins out of 27) in 1989 until it was surpassed by Ichiyo Shimizu in 1993 (0.897) and the record winning streak of 17 games in a row in 1982 until it was beaten by Hiroe Nakai in 2010 (19 games) and Kana Satomi in 2015 (21 games).

Promotion history

Titles and other championships

Hayashiba won a total of 15 titles in her career. She won the Women's Meijin title 4 times, the  title 10 times, and the  1 time. When she was 15 years old, she became the youngest to win the Women's Meijin and the first as well as youngest to win two titles (2 crowns) at the same time.

Since she won the Women's Ōshō title more than 5 times, she was the first to qualify for the prestigious Lifetime Women's Ōshō (Queen Ōshō) title in 1985. However, since she left the JSA instead of retiring via the normal channels, she was not given the title.

She won the  once in 1989.

She won the Women's Amateur Meijin tournament in 1979 when she was 11 years old.

Awards and honors

Hayashiba has received a number of Japan Shogi Association Annual Shogi Awards in recognition of her accomplishments in shogi.

Annual shogi awards

 10th Annual Awards (April 1982–March 1983): Female Professional Award
 11th Annual Awards (April 1983–March 1984): Female Professional Award
 12th Annual Awards (April 1984–March 1985): Female Professional Award
 14th Annual Awards (April 1986–March 1987): Female Professional Award
 17th Annual Awards (April 1989–March 1990): Female Professional Award
 18th Annual Awards (April 1980–March 1991): Female Professional Award

References

External links

 林葉の振飛車　part１ · blog post about Hayashiba's shogi strategies

1968 births
20th-century Japanese novelists
21st-century Japanese novelists
Light novelists
Writers from Fukuoka (city)
Professional shogi players from Fukuoka Prefecture
Japanese shogi players
Living people
Retired women's professional shogi players
Japanese actresses
Japanese television personalities
Japanese businesspeople
Manga writers
Female comics writers
People from Fukuoka
Women's Meijin
Women's Ōshō
Kurashiki Tōka Cup
21st-century pseudonymous writers
Pseudonymous women writers